Trachydoras brevis is a species of thorny catfish found in the Negro and Essequibo River basins of Guyana and Brazil.  This species grows to a length of  SL.

References 
 

Doradidae
Fish of South America
Fish of Brazil
Vertebrates of Guyana
Taxa named by Rudolf Kner
Fish described in 1853